Coco weAfrica (born August 22, 1991), is a Zimbabwean award-winning artist, popular as a modern musician on Afrobeats, who rose to fame in 2016 with his hit song Mai VaDhikondo. At the time he was known as Coco Master, which he then changed to Coco weAfrica.

Early life
Coco weAfrica was born in 1991 in Mashonaland West Province. He attended primary school at Lancaster Primary School, and high school at Chidamoyo High School in Chidamoyo Rural District, up to form two. He then went to Chikangwe Boarding High School in Karoi, Zimbabwe. He studied marketing with the London Centre of Marketing and also has a Certificate in National HIV Prevention Behavior Change Programme.

Music career
Coco initially ventured into the music industry as a Hiphop artiste in November 2016 and has worked with many distinct artists and producers such as Freeman, Andy Muridzo, Nutty O, Jah Signal Dj Tamuka, Chiweddah and Oskid. Coco is joined by Jah Prayzah, Ginimbi, Casper Nyovest and other high-profile celebrities as exclusive brand ambassadors to “Chasers” the elite clothing label.

Discography

Albums
Follow Me (EP)

Singles
Mai VaDhikondo
Hona - featuring Hubby Blakes 
Pampaka - featuring Nutty O
Hustlers - featuring Freeman
Gokamu
Kamilia
Guveya
Cruise Control
Shadabu 
Volume 
You 
Hustlers
Replay 
Tell Me

Awards and accolades

References

21st-century Zimbabwean male singers
1991 births
Living people
People from Mashonaland Central Province
Zimbabwean composers
Zimbabwean songwriters